The Hilton Orlando Buena Vista Palace is a 1,011-room resort at the Walt Disney World Resort in Lake Buena Vista, Florida, United States. It is located on  directly across from the Disney Springs Marketplace.  The  hotel, which opened on March 10, 1983, is among the ten resorts that make up the Disney Springs Resort Area.  It is one of seven resorts in the Disney Springs Resort Area not owned or operated by Disney. The hotel is connected to Disney Springs® by pedestrian skybridges, as well as a shuttle service to all the Disney Parks.

Branding history 
The Buena Vista Palace Resort & Spa was rebranded and renamed as the Wyndham Palace Resort & Spa in November 1998 (the hotel's owners, who had acquired the hotel a year earlier, had purchased Wyndham earlier in the year).  In 2005, the Blackstone Group acquired Wyndham International and announced plans to launch a new brand LXR Luxury Resorts.  LXR Luxury Resorts would consist of 21 premium properties wholly owned by the Blackstone Group, including the former Wyndham Palace which reverted to its original name in 2006. The hotel was sold to the Hilton Corporation in 2015, and has since been renamed as the "Hilton Orlando Buena Vista Palace".

Promotion 
In the late 80s, the Buena Vista Palace was also used as a Grand Prize in the Nickelodeon Game Shows, Double Dare And Think Fast.

Hilton acquisition 
In 2015, the Hilton Corporation acquired the hotel. With the acquisition, a multi-million-dollar renovation of the entire hotel commenced.

History

References

External links 
Hilton Orlando Buena Vista Palace official website
Hotel page on LXR website
Hotel page on Downtown Disney Resort Area Hotels website
Hotel page on disneyworld.com website

Hotels in Walt Disney World Resort
Hotels established in 1983
Hotel buildings completed in 1983
Destination spas
1983 establishments in Florida